Abdul Hamid Sebba (2 December 1934 – 9 April 2021) was a Brazilian lawyer and politician.

Biography
He served as a member of the Legislative Assembly of Goiás from 1995 to 2007.

Hamid Sebba died of COVID-19 in Goiânia on 9 April 2021, at the age of 86.

References

1934 births
2021 deaths
Brazilian politicians
Members of the Legislative Assembly of Goiás
People from Goiás
Deaths from the COVID-19 pandemic in Goiás

Brazilian people of Arab descent